John Kenneth Holt CD (11 July 1947 – 19 October 2014) was a Jamaican reggae singer who first found fame as a member of The Paragons, before establishing himself as a solo artist.

Early life
Holt was born in the Greenwich Farm area of Kingston in 1947. His mother Amy was a nurse. By the age of 12, he was a regular entrant in talent contests run at Jamaican theatres by Vere Johns, winning 28 contests, some broadcast live on Radio Jamaica.

Career and recognition 
He recorded his first single in 1963 with "Forever I'll Stay"/"I Cried a Tear" for record producer Leslie Kong, and also recorded a duet with Alton Ellis, "Rum Bumper", for producer Vincent "Randy" Chin.

In 1965 Holt joined Bob Andy, Garth "Tyrone" Evans, and Junior Menz in their group the Binders; Menz departed to be replaced by Howard Barrett and they changed their name to the Paragons. They initially recorded for Clement "Coxsone" Dodd's Studio One before cutting a succession of singles for Duke Reid at his Treasure Isle Studio in the rocksteady era of 1966–1968; They enjoyed a string of hits, including "Ali Baba", "Tonight", "I See Your Face", and the Holt-penned "The Tide Is High" (later made famous by Blondie and also covered by Atomic Kitten). "Wear You to the Ball" was another of his hits with the Paragons, and it made the charts again when U-Roy (whom he had introduced to Duke Reid) recorded a Deejay version over it. With Andy having left early on, the departures of Barrett (in 1969) and Evans (in 1970), who had both won scholarships in the US, brought the group to an end. During his time with the Paragons, he also recorded solo material for Bunny Lee ("Tonight"), and Harry J. He subsequently concentrated on his solo career, recording for Prince Buster ("Oh Girl", "Rain From the Skies"), Reid ("Stealing Stealing", "Ali Baba"), Dodd (including "Fancy Make-up", "A Love I Can Feel", "Let's Build Our Dreams" and "OK Fred"), Alvin Ranglin ("Strange Things"), and Phil Pratt ("My Heart Is Gone").

By the early 1970s, he was one of the biggest stars of reggae, and his work with producer Lee was key to his success; "Stick By Me" was the biggest selling Jamaican record of 1972, one of a number of records recorded with Lee. His 1973 Harry Mudie-produced album, Time Is The Master, was successful, with orchestral arrangements recorded in London by Tony Ashfield. The success of the string-laden reggae led to Trojan Records issuing a series of similarly arranged albums produced by Ashfield starting with the 1,000 Volts of Holt in 1973, a compilation of Holt's reggae cover versions of popular hits (and later followed by similarly named releases up to the Lee-produced 3,000 Volts of Holt). 1,000 Volts spawned the UK Top 10 hit "Help Me Make It Through the Night" (written by Kris Kristofferson), which peaked at number 6, and included covers of Billy Joel's "Just the Way You Are" and "Touch Me in the Morning" by Diana Ross.

He had success back in Jamaica in 1976 with "Up Park Camp" (on a reworking of the Heptones' "Get in the Groove" rhythm), and his success continued into the 1980s with tracks such as "Police in Helicopter" and "Fat She Fat", recorded with producer Henry "Junjo" Lawes, and a standout appearance at the 1982 Reggae Sunsplash festival. "Police in Helicopter" was a condemnation of the Jamaican government's crackdown on marijuana plantations. The cover to the album single pictured Holt growing locks and a beard, an indication of the increasing importance of Rastafari in his life. He continued to tour regularly, performed several times at Sunsplash in the 1990s, and performed in the United Kingdom with the Royal Philharmonic Concert Orchestra, with a live album taken from these shows released in 2001.

In 2004 he was awarded the Order of Distinction (Commander Class) by the Jamaican government for his contribution to Jamaican music.

Holt's style, notably slower and more romantic than most of his contemporaries, is a recognisable forerunner of the lovers rock subgenre.

His song "Man Next Door" has been covered by numerous other reggae artists, including Dennis Brown, UB40 and Horace Andy. The latter sang in a more electronic vein for the Massive Attack album Mezzanine.

In February 2022, the 1973 compilation of Holt's recordings, 1000 Volts of Holt, received gold certification from the British Phonographic Industry (BPI) for sales in the UK.

Personal life and death
Having been taken ill at the One Love Festival on 16 August, Holt died on 19 October 2014 in the Wellington Hospital in London. He had been diagnosed with colon cancer in June 2014. 

He is survived by his wife Valerie, 12 children, and 25 grandchildren. His funeral took place on 17 November at Holy Trinity Cathedral in Kingston, and featured performances by U-Roy, The Silvertones, Tinga Stewart, Boris Gardiner, George Nooks, Luciano, Carlene Davis, Ken Boothe, and members of Holt's family, backed by Lloyd Parks and the We the People Band. He was buried at Dovecot Memorial Park.

Album discography
A Love I Can Feel (1971), Bamboo
Like a Bolt (1971), Treasure Isle
OK Fred (1972), Melodisc
Holt (1973), Jaguar
Still in Chains (1973), Trojan
Pledging My Love (1972), Jackpot/Trojan
Time Is the Master (1973), Moodisc
Presenting the Fabulous John Holt (1974), Magnet
The Further You Look (1974), Trojan
Dusty Roads (1974), Trojan
Sings for I (1974), Trojan
A Love I Can Feel (1974), Attack
Don't Break Your Promise (1974), Lord Koos
Before the Next Tear Drop (1976), Klik
Up Park Camp (1976), Channel One
World of Love (1977), Justice
Channel One Presents the Magnificent John Holt (1977), Channel One
Roots of Holt (1977), Trojan
Showcase (New Disco Style) (1977), Thunderbolt
Holt Goes Disco (1977), Trojan
In Demand (1978), Dynamic Sounds
Let It Go On (1978), Trojan
Super Star (1978), Weed Beat
The Impressable John Holt (Disco Mix) (1978), Harry J
Peace in the Sun (1978), Volt
Just a Country Boy (1978), Trojan
Introspective (1980), Dynamic Sounds
My Desire (1980), Jackpot
Children of the World (1981), VP
A1 Disco Showcase (1981), Taurus
Just the Two of Us (1982), CSA
Sweetie Come Brush Me (1982), Volcano
Gold (1983), Creole
Police in Helicopter (1983), Greensleeves/Arrival
For Lovers and Dancers (1984), Trojan
Live in London (1984), Very Good
Pure Gold (1985), Vista Sounds
Wild Fire (1985), Natty Congo/Tad's (with Dennis Brown)
Vibes (1985), Leggo Sounds
The Reggae Christmas Hits Album (1986), Trojan
From One Extreme to Another (1986), Beta
Time Is the Master (1988), Creole
Sweetie Come Brush Me – Greatest Hits (1988), ROHIT
Rock with Me Baby (1988), Trojan
If I Were a Carpenter (1989)
Why I Care (1989), Greensleeves
Reggae, Hip House, R&B Flavor (1993)
Reggae Peacemaker (1993), House of Reggae
All Night Long (1997), MIL
New Horizon (1998), VP
John Holt in Symphony with The Royal Philharmonic Concert Orchestra (2001), Jet Star
Born Free (2001)
Fist Full of Holt (2009)

There have also been dozens of compilations of Holt's work, starting in the early 1970s with a Greatest Hits compilation from Studio One, and notably followed by the 1,000 Volts... series on Trojan Records.

DVDs
John Holt in Symphony With the Royal Philharmonic Concert Orchestra (2003)
John Holt & Freddie McGregor – Living Legends Live in Concert (2011)

References

External links
John Holt biography at Allmusic website
Riddimguide information
John Holt at Roots Archives
 "Veteran reggae singer John Holt dies aged 69", Guardian music, 20 October 2014.

1947 births
2014 deaths
Deaths from colorectal cancer
Jamaican reggae musicians
Rocksteady musicians
Musicians from Kingston, Jamaica
Island Records artists
Trojan Records artists
Recipients of the Order of Distinction
Jamaican male singers
Deaths from cancer in England
VP Records artists
Greensleeves Records artists